Alessio Fasano is an Italian-born medical doctor, pediatric gastroenterologist and researcher. He currently holds many roles, including professor of pediatrics at Harvard Medical School and professor of nutrition at Harvard T.H. Chan School of Public Health, both in Boston. He serves as director of the Center for Celiac Research and Treatment at MassGeneral Hospital for Children (MGHfC) and co-director of the Harvard Medical School Celiac Research Program. In addition, he is director of the Mucosal Immunology and Biology Research Center at MGHfC, where he oversees a research program with approximately 50 scientists and staff researching a variety of acute and chronic inflammatory diseases, including cystic fibrosis, celiac disease, enteric infections and necrotizing enterocolitis. A common theme of these programs is the study of the emerging role of the gut microbiome in health and disease. Fasano is also the scientific director of the European Biomedical Research Institute of Salerno (EBRIS) in Italy. Along with these leadership positions, he is a practicing outpatient clinician in pediatric gastroenterology and nutrition and the division chief.

Education 
After graduating summa cum laude from the University of Naples School of Medicine in Italy (medicine and surgery), Fasano undertook intensive medical internships and residency in pediatrics, emergency medicine, and pediatric social medicine. After completing his final internship in 1993, he joined the faculty of the University of Maryland School of Medicine in Baltimore, Maryland, as an associate professor, became a professor of pediatrics, medicine, and physiology in 1996, and remained in teaching roles at the university for over 20 years. He founded the Center for Celiac Research in 1996, which he moved to Massachusetts General Hospital in 2003. He is still an active professor of pediatrics and nutrition.

Work  
Fasano began his career as a pediatric gastroenterologist interested in treating debilitating diarrhea, as well as a researcher determined to find a vaccine for cholera. He was responsible for the discovery of several new enterotoxins involved in the diarrheal pathogenesis of several pathogens, including Shigella, E. coli, and V. cholerae. These discoveries led to the engineering of attenuated enteric vaccines, some of them currently used in clinical practice.

The course of this research path eventually led him and his team to the "serendipitous" discovery of zonulin in 2000, a protein responsible for regulating intestinal tight-junctions. His major research focus then shifted to the study of intestinal permeability, the pathophysiology of the paracellular pathway, and how disruption of gut barrier function factors into chronic inflammatory disease development.

His current research focuses include intestinal mucosal biology and immunology, the gut microbiome, and bacterial pathogenesis, as well as the immune host response. His clinical specialty lays in gluten-related disorders (celiac disease, wheat allergy, non-celiac gluten sensitivity) as well as other autoimmune and inflammatory disorders (diabetes mellitus type 1, autism, schizophrenia, and others).

Impact 
Fasano is considered an expert and pioneering researcher worldwide in the field of celiac disease and bacterial pathogenesis. Not only did he found the premier celiac research center in the United States, but the impact of his more than 300 peer-reviewed journal publications and 160 patents has greatly shaped and advanced the knowledge of a multitude of chronic inflammatory diseases and immune diseases. He was among the top 1 percent cited scientists worldwide based on Web of Science Group's annual list of Highly Cited Researchers.

Throughout his career, he has prioritized and advocated for his patients by disseminating his research to the general public along with expansive outreach efforts. He often collaborates with celiac support organizations and government agencies to work toward this goal, and actively participates in fundraising efforts for the Center for Celiac Research and Treatment. He is the author of multiple books and has been featured in journals, magazines and interviews for the general public.

He has published numerous groundbreaking research studies, including the 2000 discovery of the zonulin protein and its regulation and modulation of intestinal permeability. In 2003, he published the results of the epidemiological study that demonstrated the prevalence of celiac disease in the U.S. to be far higher than previously thought, at a rate of 1 in 133 persons. His work also contributed to the development of an anti-tissue transglutaminase (tTG) diagnostic test for celiac disease, that is part of standard diagnostic testing for celiac disease.

Awards 
Fasano has received several awards for his work. Some notable awards include:

Book Publications  

 Fast Facts. Celiac Disease. By Fasano A, Holmes G, Catassi C. Oxford: Health Press, 2009.
 Gluten Freedom. By Fasano A, Flaherty S. Wiley, 2014.
 Senza glutine. La celiachia non si cura, si gestisce (in Italian). By Fasano A. Mondadori, 2017.
 Se libérer du gluten: Le guide référence de la sensibilité au gluten et de la maladie coeliaque (Essai-Santé) (French Edition). By Fasano A. Marabout, 2017.
 A Clinical Guide to Gluten-Related Disorders Paperback. By Fasano A. LWW, 2013.
 Frontiers in Celiac Disease. By Fasano A, Troncone R, Branski D, eds. S. Karger Publishers, 2008.
 From Ptolemaus to Copernicus: The Evolving System of Gluten-Related Disorder. By Catassi C, Fasano A. Mdpi AG, 2018.
 Dieta Sem Glúten - Um Guia Essencial Para Uma Vida Saudável (in Portuguese). By Fasano A, Flaherty S, Rocha B. Madras, 2015.
 Gut Feelings: The Microbiome and Our Health. By Fasano A, Flaherty S. MIT Press, 2021.

Cited Publications 
Fasano has authored (or co-authored) over 300 peer-reviewed publications. Some high-impact publications include:

References

External links 
Harvard Medical School https://hms.harvard.edu/
Harvard T.H. Chan School of Public Health https://www.hsph.harvard.edu/
Center for Celiac Research and Treatment https://www.massgeneral.org/children/celiac-disease
MassGeneral Hospital for Children https://www.massgeneral.org/children
Harvard Medical School Celiac Research Program https://hms.harvard.edu/departments/hms-celiac-research-program
Mucosal Immunology and Biology Research Center https://www.massgeneral.org/children/mucosal-immunology
European Biomedical Research Institute of Salerno https://www.ebris.eu/home-english
University of Naples School of Medicine https://www.italymedicalschools.com/university-of-napoli-federico-ii/

Italian pediatricians
Living people
Year of birth missing (living people)
Italian gastroenterologists
Harvard Medical School faculty
University of Naples Federico II alumni
University of Maryland, Baltimore faculty